Vivian Dawson (born July 18, 1984), better known by his stage name Jinrong, is a New Zealand actor and model.

Early life and education 
Dawson was born in Canada on July 18, 1984 and grew up in New Zealand. His father is a New Zealander, while his mother was a Chinese Singaporean. Dawson majored in Physiology at University of Otago and graduated in 2007. After he graduated, he worked as a fitness professional in a health club in Melbourne and then moved to Singapore.

Career
In 2009, Dawson won for CLEO (Singapore)'s 50 most eligible bachelors of 2009. In 2010, Dawson featured in the music video of Taiwanese singer Jolin Tsai song "Love Player". Dawson made his acting debut in Taiwanese film Double Trouble (2012). Dawson  replaced the British actor Rhydian Vaughn and featured in two of the highest-grossing Chinese films, Tiny Times 3 (2014) and Tiny Times 4 (2015), which also helped him garnered more popularity in Greater China.

Personal life
In September 2010, Dawson and Tsai were spotted on a date in Tokyo.  In February 2013, Dawson took Jolin Tsai to visit his parents and relatives in New Zealand. In December 2016, Jolin Tsai's manager Tom Wang confirmed that Dawson and Tsai broke up amicably in November and remain close friends.

Filmography 
 Double Trouble (2012)
 Lover Run (2013)
 Sorry, I Love You (2014)
 Tiny Times 3 (2014)
 Tiny Times 4 (2015)
 All You Need is Love (2015)
 Running After the Love (2015)
 Xuanzang (2016)
 For a Few Bullets (2016)
 The Eight Immortals in School 2 (2016)
 Butterfly Cemetery (2017)
 My Other Home (2017)
 The Gravity of a Rainbow (2019)
 Once Upon a Time in Lingjian Mountain (2019)
 "Miss S" (2020)

References

External links 
 
 
 
 
 

1984 births
Living people
21st-century New Zealand male actors
Canadian emigrants to New Zealand
New Zealand male film actors
New Zealand male television actors
New Zealand people of Chinese descent
New Zealand people of Singaporean descent